HMS Trusty (N45) was a T-class submarine of the Royal Navy. She was laid down by Vickers Armstrong, Barrow and launched in March 1941.

Career

Trusty served in the Mediterranean and in the Pacific Far East.  She sank the Italian merchant Eridano in December 1941, and on reassigning to the Pacific, she sank the Japanese merchant cargo ship Toyohashi Maru and damaged the Japanese troop transport Columbia Maru.

She survived the war and was sold to be broken up for scrap in January 1947. She was scrapped at Milford Haven in July 1947.

Notes

References
 
  
 
 
 
 

 

British T-class submarines of the Royal Navy
Ships built in Barrow-in-Furness
1941 ships
World War II submarines of the United Kingdom